Pickworth is a surname. Notable people with the surname include:

Brian Pickworth (1929–2020), New Zealand fencer
Henry Pickworth (c.1673?–c.1738), English religious controversialist
Ossie Pickworth (1918–1969), Australian golfer
Paul Pickworth (born 1958), English cricketer